Mason County is a county in the U.S. state of Illinois. According to the 2020 census, it had a population of 13,086. Its county seat is Havana. The county is named in honor of George Mason, a member of the Virginia legislature who campaigned for the adoption of the United States Bill of Rights.

History
Mason County was created in 1841 out of portions of Tazewell and Menard counties.

Geography

Mason County is bound on the south by the Sangamon River, and on the west by the Illinois River. These rivers join at the county's southwest tip.

The soil covering much of Mason County is very sandy. This was formed during the melting of the Wisconsin Glacier about 10,000 years ago. Meltwater from the glacier deposited large amounts of sand in a delta region near at the junction of the Sangamon and Illinois Rivers.

The sandy soil does not hold water well, quickly exposing crops to drought conditions as the water table drops during periods of low precipitation. However, the soil is very good for growing vegetables that are otherwise not common in Illinois. Modern irrigation has made this a highly productive agricultural area.

A sand wetland on the Illinois River is managed by the U.S. Fish and Wildlife Service as the Chautauqua National Wildlife Refuge.

Climate and weather

Major highways
  U.S. Highway 136
  Illinois Route 10
  Illinois Route 29
  Illinois Route 78
  Illinois Route 97

Adjacent counties
 Fulton County - northwest
 Tazewell County - northeast
 Logan County - southeast
 Menard County - south
 Cass County - southwest
 Schuyler County - west

National protected area
 Chautauqua National Wildlife Refuge (part)

Demographics

As of the 2010 United States Census, there were 14,666 people, 6,079 households, and 4,060 families living in the county. The racial makeup of the county was 98.1% white, 0.4% black or African American, 0.3% Asian, 0.2% American Indian, 0.1% from other races, and 0.9% from two or more races. Those of Hispanic or Latino origin made up 0.8% of the population. In terms of ancestry, 33.8% were German, 15.6% were American, 11.1% were English, and 10.3% were Irish.

Of the 6,079 households, 28.9% had children under the age of 18 living with them, 52.1% were married couples living together, 10.3% had a female householder with no husband present, 33.2% were non-families, and 28.4% of all households were made up of individuals. The average household size was 2.38 and the average family size was 2.87. The median age was 44.0 years.

The median income for a household in the county was $42,461 and the median income for a family was $51,348. Males had a median income of $43,448 versus $31,087 for females. The per capita income for the county was $23,427. About 13.8% of families and 15.2% of the population were below the poverty line, including 23.6% of those under age 18 and 7.5% of those age 65 or over.

Mason County was identified as a “sundown” county which “has remained all white for many decades, despite its location between Springfield and Peoria...”.

Communities

Cities
 Havana (seat)
 Mason City

Town
 Topeka

Villages

 Bath
 Easton
 Forest City
 Kilbourne
 Manito
 San Jose

Census-designated place
 Goofy Ridge

Other unincorporated communities

 Biggs
 Bishop
 Lakewood
 Matanzas Beach

Townships

 Allens Grove
 Bath
 Crane Creek
 Forest City
 Havana
 Kilbourne
 Lynchburg
 Manito
 Mason City
 Pennsylvania
 Quiver
 Salt Creek
 Sherman

Politics
Although it voted for the Whig Party in the three elections from 1840 to 1848, Mason County was to be solidly Democratic for the next sixty to seventy years due to its anti-Yankee German-American heritage. It was not until the 1920 election when bitter resentment was felt by German-Americans at Woodrow Wilson’s postwar policies that Mason supported a GOP candidate.

In the following eighty years, Mason was a Republican-leaning swing county, although isolationist sentiment did cause it to vote narrowly for Wendell Willkie in 1940 and more convincingly for Thomas E. Dewey in 1944.

See also
 National Register of Historic Places listings in Mason County, Illinois

References

 
Illinois counties
1841 establishments in Illinois
Populated places established in 1841